2010 United Kingdom Budget may refer to:

March 2010 United Kingdom budget
June 2010 United Kingdom budget